Canyon Rose Academy is a tuition free public high school in Tucson, Arizona, United States. Canyon Rose serves the communities of central and eastern Tucson.

References

External links
Arizona Department of Education information

Charter schools in Arizona
Public high schools in Arizona
Schools in Tucson, Arizona
Schools in Pima County, Arizona